Lake Louise is a lake in Douglas County, in the U.S. state of Minnesota.

Lake Louise was named for the daughter of a pioneer who named another nearby lake for his son: Lake Charley.

See also
List of lakes in Minnesota

References

Lakes of Minnesota
Lakes of Douglas County, Minnesota